Michalis Fakinos (b. 1940, Athens, Greece) is an acclaimed Greek writer. He was a journalist for the major Greek newspaper Ta Nea from 1961 to 2000 and he taught journalism at the Panteion University (1999–2000). Some of his works have been translated into French, German and Dutch.

Works

Novels
Βυζαντινή Περίπολος (Byzantine Patrol), 1988
Ως φαίνεται η γιαγιά κοιμάται ακόμη (As it seems, the grandmother is still asleep), 1991
Η Ιουλιέτα αγαπά τα ροδάκινα (Juliet likes peaches), 1994
Το τελευταίο μυθιστόρημα του 20ου αιώνα (The last novel of the 20th century), 1999
Η επικάλυψη δεν είναι σοκολάτα (The topping isn't chocolate), 2002
Αμερικάνικη κραυγή (American scream), 2005

Short stories
Οι κωπηλάτες (The oarsmen), (1983)
Ο Ιωσήφ εξαφανίζεται (Joseph disappears), 1984
Όμηρος Μπαρ (Bar "Homer"), 1997

Theater
Ματ (Check Mate), 1985 
Waiting for Beckett, 2000

External links
Selected lyrics
His page at the website of the Hellenic Authors' Society (Greek)

Notes

1940 births
Greek male novelists
Living people